FL 19,99  is a 1998 Dutch comedy film directed by Mart Dominicus. It ran at the Rotterdam Film Festival. The distribution was by the project  Route 2000, a forerunner of Telefilm

Plot 

An Amsterdam hotel runs a millennium offer. People can stay overnight for only fl 19,99 (€ 9). It's a big success, and the hotel is quickly booked. The film follows the people living on one of the floors coming in and going out and the things they encounter.

Cast 
Thomas Acda
Jacqueline Blom
Elsie de Braauw
Lenny Breederveld
Tjebbo Gerritsma
Albert de Haan
Mischa Hulshof
Michiel de Jong
Peggy Jane de Schepper
Peter Paul Muller
Hero Muller
Dimme Treurniet
Jeroen Willems

External links 
 

1998 films
1990s Dutch-language films
1998 comedy films
Dutch comedy films